Shark Island or "Death Island" was one of five concentration camps in German South West Africa. It was located on Shark Island off Lüderitz, in the far south-west of the territory which today is Namibia. It was used by the German Empire during the Herero and Namaqua genocide of 1904–08. Between 1,032 and 3,000 Herero and Namaqua men, women, and children died in the camp between March 1905 and its closing in April 1907.

Background

On 12 January 1904, the Herero people rebelled against German colonial rule under the leadership of Samuel Maharero. Origins of the Herero revolt date back to the 1890s when tribes settled in Namibia came under pressure from the growing number of German settlers wanting their land, cattle, and labor. Factors such as loss of property, increasing debt in an attempt to resettle lost herds, low wages on white-owned farms, and racial inequalities only intensified the hostility between the Herero and the Germans.

When the Herero rebelled, they killed over 100 German settlers near the town of Okahandja. Over 15,000 German reinforcements under the command of Lothar Von Trotha defeated the Herero force at the Waterberg River in August 1904.

Two months later, the Nama people broke out in a similar rebellion against German colonists. Traditional rivalries prevented the Herero and Nama from joining together, however both groups continued fighting guerrilla warfare against the German colonial forces.

Following the abandonment of Lothar von Trotha's policy of exterminating Herero within the borders of German South West Africa by denying them access to water holes, the colonial authorities adopted a policy of sweeping the bush clear of Herero – both civilians and rebels – and removing them, either voluntarily or by force, to concentration camps.

Operation

Establishment

Although there are records of Herero prisoners-of-war being held in Lüderitz Bay as early as 1904, the first references to a camp at Shark Island and the transfer of large numbers of Herero prisoners from Keetmanshoop are in March 1905.

From early on, large numbers of Herero died in the camp, with 59 men, 59 women and 73 children reportedly dying by late May 1905. Despite this high initial rate of mortality on the island which, with its cold climate, was unsuitable for habitation, particularly for people used to the dry, arid climate of the veld, the German authorities continued to transfer people from the interior to the island, ostensibly because of a lack of food in the interior, but also because they wished to use the prisoners as labour in constructing a railway connecting Lüderitz with Aus.

Conditions at the camp

Word quickly spread among the Herero of the conditions at the camp, with prisoners in other parts of German South West Africa reportedly committing suicide rather than be deported to Lüderitz due to the stories of harsh conditions there in late 1905. Due to the camp's reputation, detainees were not told where they were being sent to reduce the chance of revolt or escape. The Cape Argus, a South African newspaper, also ran stories describing terrible conditions at the camp in late September 1905. One transport rider who was described as having been employed at the camp in early 1905 was quoted as saying:

August Kuhlmann was one of the first civilians to visit the camp. What he witnessed shocked him as he described in September 1905:A woman, who was so weak from illness that she could not stand, crawled to some of the other prisoners to beg for water. The overseer fired five shots at her. Two shots hit her: one in the thigh, the other smashing her forearm... In the night she died.

Many cases of rape of prisoners by Germans were reported at the camp. Although some of these cases did result in the perpetrator being successfully punished where a "white champion" took up the victim's cause, the majority of cases went unpunished.

Other factors such as minimal food rations, uncontrolled diseases, and maltreatment led to high mortality rates. Prisoners typically received a handful of uncooked rice. Diseases such as typhoid spread quickly. Prisoners were concentrated in large, unsanitary living quarters with low medical attention. Beating occurred frequently as the German officials often used the sjambok to force prisoners to work.

Arrival of the Nama

Whilst the Germans initially followed a policy of sending people from the south to concentration camps in the north, and vice versa, meaning that Nama prisoners mostly went to concentration camps around the city of Windhoek, by mid-1906 Germans in Windhoek were becoming increasingly concerned about the presence of so many prisoners in their city.

In response to these concerns, in August 1906 the Germans began to transfer Nama prisoners to Shark Island, sending them by cattle-car to Swakopmund and then by sea to Lüderitz. The Nama leader, Samuel Isaak, protested this, saying that their transfer to Lüderitz had not been part of the agreement under which they had surrendered to the Germans, however, the Germans ignored these protests. By late 1906, 2,000 Nama were held prisoner on the island.

Forced labour

The prisoners held on Shark Island were used as forced labour throughout the camp's existence. This labour was made available by the German army Etappenkommando for use by private companies throughout the Lüderitz area, working on infrastructure projects such as railway construction, the building of the harbour, and flattening and levelling Shark Island through the use of explosives. This highly dangerous and physical work inevitably led to large-scale sickness and death amongst the prisoners, with one German technician complaining that the 1,600-strong Nama work force had shrunk to a strength of only 30–40 available for work due to 7–8 deaths occurring daily by late 1906. The policy of forced labour officially ended when prisoner-of-war status for the Herero and Nama was revoked on 1 April 1908, although Herero and Nama continued to labour on colonial projects after this.

Closing

The decision to close the camp was made by Major Ludwig von Estorff, the new commander of the Schutztruppe of German South West Africa who had signed the agreement under which the Witbooi (a Nama tribe) had surrendered to the Germans, after a visit to the camp in early 1907. After the closing of the camp, prisoners were transferred to an open area near Radford Bay. Whilst mortality rates were still high initially in the new camp, they eventually declined.

Death toll

The precise number of deaths at the camp are unknown. A report by the German Imperial Colonial Office estimated 7,682 Herero and 2,000 Nama dead at all camps in German South West Africa, of which a significant portion died at Shark Island. A military official at the camp estimated 1,032 out of 1,795 prisoners held at the camp in September 1906 having died, it is estimated that eventually only 245 of these prisoners survived. In December 1906, an average of 8.5 prisoners died per day. By March 1907, according to records that do exist, 1,203 Nama prisoners had died on the island. The over-all figure for deaths at the camp has been estimated as being as many as 3,000. Combined with deaths amongst prisoners held elsewhere in Lüderitz bay, the total may well exceed 4,000.

The vast majority of these prisoners died through preventable diseases such as typhoid and scurvy exacerbated by malnutrition, over-work and the unsanitary conditions in the camps.

Medical investigation
In 1906, research was conducted by the doctor Eugen Fischer, later a prominent Nazi scientist, on the skulls of dead prisoners and on prisoners with scurvy by Dr. Bofinger. In 2001 a number of these skulls were returned from German institutions to Namibia. The captured women were forced to boil heads of their dead inmates (some of whom may have been their relatives or acquaintances) and scrape remains of their skin and eyes with shards of glass, preparing them for examinations by German universities.
 This work was performed at the camp at Swakopmund, and some of these experiments were conducted by the German doctors to develop their race theories about the evolutionary proximity of black Africans to apes.

See also

 German South West Africa
 Herero Wars
 Herero and Namaqua Genocide
 Research Materials: Max Planck Society Archive

References

Sources
 Adhikari, Mohamed. “‘Streams of Blood and Streams of Money’: New Perspectives on the Annihilation of the Herero and Nama Peoples of Namibia, 1904–1908.” Edited by Jeremy Silvester, Jan-Bart Gewald, Casper Erichsen, Jürgen Zimmerer, and Joachim Zeller. Kronos, no. 34 (2008): 303–320.
 Bartrop, Paul R., and Steven Leonard Jacobs. Modern Genocide: The Definitive Resource and Document Collection. ABC-CLIO, 2014.
 Drechsler, Horst. Let Us Die Fighting: The Struggle of the Herero and Nama against German Imperialism (1884–1915), Akademie-Verlag Berlin, 1986 (3rd Ed.)
 
 Erichsen, Casper, and David Olusoga. The Kaiser’s Holocaust: Germany’s Forgotten Genocide and the Colonial Roots of Nazism. Faber & Faber, 2010.
 Gewald, Jan-Bart. Herero Heroes: A Socio-Political History of the Herero of Namibia 1890–1923, James Currey, Oxford, 1999.
 Lau, Brigitte. History and Historiography: 4 essays in reprint, Discourse/MSORP, Windhoek, May, 1995.
 
 Report on the natives of South West Africa and their treatment by Germany, Administrator's Office, Windhuk [sic], London: His Majesty's Stationery Office, 1918. (Blue Book)
 

German South West Africa
Internment camps
Herero and Namaqua genocide
1905 establishments in German South West Africa
Buildings and structures in ǁKaras Region
Lüderitz